It's Hard to Be a Baby is the sixth album by Electric Company, released on February 4, 2003 through Tigerbeat6.

Track listing

Personnel 
Brad Laner – vocals, guitar, synthesizer, programming, production

References 

2003 albums
Electric Company (band) albums
Tigerbeat6 albums